Thaumatomonadida is an order of flagellates.

Taxonomy
Order Thaumatomonadida Shirkina 1987
 Genus Cowlomonas Scoble & Cavalier-Smith 2014
 Genus Heterochromonas Lee & Patterson 2000
 Family Esquamulidae Shiratori, Yabuki & Ishida 2012
 Genus Esquamula Shiratori, Yabuki & Ishida 2012
 Family Peregriniidae Cavalier-Smith 2011
 Genus Gyromitus Skuja 1939
 Genus Peregrinia Cavalier-Smith 2011 non Vorobyeva & Lebedev 1986
 Family Thaumatomonadidae Hollande 1952 (Thaumatomastigidae Vørs 1992; Thaumatomastigaceae Patterson & Zölffel 1991]
 Genus Allas Sandon 1927
 Genus Hyaloselene Skuja 1956
 Genus Thaumatomastix Lauterborn 1899 [Chrysosphaerella Balonov 1980 non Lauterborn 1896; ; Spinifermonas Nicholls 1984; Thaumatonema Lauterborn 1896]
 Genus Thaumatospina Scoble & Cavalier-Smith 2014
 Genus Scutellomonas Scoble & Cavalier-Smith 2014
 Genus Ovaloplaca Scoble & Cavalier-Smith 2014
 Genus Reckertia Conrad 1920 emend. Cavalier-Smith 2011
 Genus Thaumatomonas de Saedeleer 1931

References

Cercozoa orders
Imbricatea